The Swedish Ambassador in Lima is the official representative of the Government in Stockholm to the Government of Peru as well as the Non-Resident Ambassador to La Paz (Bolivia) until 2001.

Both countries established diplomatic relations in the 1930s and maintained embasssies in both Lima and Stockholm. The embassy of Sweden in Lima was closed in 2001 but reopened in 2016 and the embassy of Peru in Stockholm was closed in 2010 but reopened in 2012.

List of representatives

See also
List of ambassadors of Peru to Sweden

References

 
Peru
Sweden